This is a list of bioterrorist incidents.

Guidelines

The definitions of bioterrorism for the purpose of this article are:
 The use of violence or of the threat of violence in the pursuit of political, religious, ideological or social objectives
 Acts committed by non-state actors (or by undercover personnel serving on the behalf of their respective governments) 
 Acts reaching more than the immediate target victims and also directed at targets consisting of a larger spectrum of society 
 Both mala prohibita (i.e., crime that is made illegal by legislation) and mala in se (i.e., crime that is inherently immoral or wrong)
 Committed with the use of biological agents

The following criteria of violence or threat of violence fall outside of the definition of this article:
 Wartime (including a declared war) or peacetime acts of violence committed by a nation state against another nation state regardless of legality or illegality and are carried out by properly uniformed forces or legal combatants of such nation states (See biological warfare)
 Reasonable acts of self-defense, such as the use of force to kill, apprehend, or punish criminals who pose a threat to the lives of humans or property
 Legitimate targets in war, such as enemy combatants and strategic infrastructure that form an integral part of the enemy's war effort such as defense industries and ports
 Collateral damage, including the infliction of incidental damage to non-combatant targets during an attack on or attempting to attack legitimate targets in war
 Targeted murders or poisonings carried out with the use of biological agents, not for political or religious purposes
 Plans that were not carried out

List

References

Bioterrorism